Sob is a verb meaning cry. 
Sob and SoB may refer to:
 Souls on Board (sometimes POB for People on Board), used in Aviation communication
 Seventeen or Bust, a distributed computing project
 Special Operations Battalion (SOB), an elite unit of the Croatian army
 Society of Old Brooklynites
 Son of a bitch, an insult or curse phrase, sometimes abbreviated as "S.O.B."
 Sons of Ben (MLS supporters association)
 Suggested opening bid, a term in auctioneering
 Super Oralloy Bomb, a nuclear bomb
 Senate Office Building
 Dirksen Senate Office Building
 Russell Senate Office Building
 Hart Senate Office Building
 S.O.B. Hill, a mountain in Utah, United States
 Start of business, the start of the business day (as opposed to EOB)

Biomedicine 
 Shortness of breath or dyspnea, a medical symptom relating to breathing difficulties
 Sobralia, a genus of orchids
 Super optimal broth, a bacterial growth medium

Music and media 
 S.O.B. (film), a 1981 film by Blake Edwards
 The Sob, a 1953 Turkish film
 S.O.B. (band), a Japanese grindcore band
 "S.O.B." (song), by Nathaniel Rateliff and the Night Sweats, 2015
 Scars on Broadway, an American rock band
 Sons of Batman, a group of characters in a Batman comics miniseries
 Sons of Butcher (band), a Canadian rock band
 Sons of Butcher (TV show), a cartoon inspired by the band
 Sounds of Blackness, an American vocal and instrumental ensemble
 SOB's, Sounds of Brazil, a live music venue in New York City
 Styles of Beyond, an underground rap group
 Switched-On Bach, an album by Walter Carlos
 S.O.B.s, an episode of the television series Arrested Development

Transport 
 Seaford-Oyster Bay Expressway
 Balaton Airport, SOB in IATA code
 Southbourne railway station, SOB in Network Rail code
 Stadt-Omnibus Bern, a former public transport operator in Bern, Switzerland
 Südostbahn, a railway company in Switzerland
 SüdostBayernBahn, a railway company in southern Germany
 MS Spirit of Britain, a Dover - Calais P&O Ferry

Toponyms 
 Sob (river), a river in Siberia, a tributary of the Ob
 Sob River, a river in Ukraine, a tributary of Southern Bug